Hassa is a town and the administrative seat of the Hassa District of Hatay Province, Turkey on the eastern side of the Nur (Amanos) Mountains, looking towards the city of Gaziantep. It is on the Antakya-Malatya road. In the late 19th and early 20th century, Hassa was part of the Adana Vilayet of the Ottoman Empire. Hassa was a district in Cebel-i Bereket Province from 1923 to 1933 and then a part of Gaziantep Province until 1939.

Hassa is an olive-growing district. The trees were first brought there by Ottoman governor Derviş Paşa in the late 19th century.

Demographics 
Hassa is a Sunni Turkmen district of Hatay province.

References

External links
Official website 

Populated places in Hatay Province